Itaquera may refer to:
 Subprefecture of Itaquera, São Paulo
 Itaquera (district of São Paulo)
 Corinthians-Itaquera (São Paulo Metro)
 Arena Corinthians or Itaquerão, a sports stadium in São Paulo